Diazepunk (sometimes typeset as dIAZEPUNK) is a punk-rock band from Perú.

Diazepunk formed in 1996 with Carlos García on vocals, Gustavo Makino on guitars, Jan Lederhausen on bass, Felipe Salmón on drums and Alberto Atún on keyboards.

Discography

En Pepas  (Demo tape)
Viernes
Bajo en Serotonina
Rock en el Parque  (Live)
Ciudad Indifferente

Compilations

Ataque Punk
Grita Sudamérica
Compilatorio 23punk
DVD Rock en el Parque VII

References 

Peruvian punk rock groups
Musical groups established in 2001